Urophora solaris is a species of tephritid or fruit flies in the genus Urophora of the family Tephritidae.

Distribution
Tadzhikistan.

References

Urophora
Insects described in 1984
Diptera of Asia